Vanheerdea is a genus of flowering plants belonging to the family Aizoaceae. It is also in Tribe Ruschieae.

It is native to the Cape Provinces of the South African Republic.

Known species
As accepted by Kew:
 Vanheerdea divergens (L.Bolus) L.Bolus ex S.A.Hammer 
 Vanheerdea primosii (L.Bolus) L.Bolus ex H.E.K.Hartmann 
 Vanheerdea roodiae (N.E.Br.) L.Bolus ex H.E.K.Hartmann

The genus name of Vanheerdea is in honour of Pieter van Heerde (1893–1979), a South African teacher and plant collector. 
It was first described and published in Bradleya Vol.10 on page 15 in 1992.

References

Aizoaceae
Aizoaceae genera
Taxa named by Louisa Bolus
Taxa named by Heidrun Hartmann
Plants described in 1992
Flora of the Cape Provinces